The Sechura District is one of the six districts that make up the Sechura Province in the Piura Region of Peru.

History

Geography

Authorities

Mayors 
 2011-2014: José Bernardo Pazo Nunura, Partido Humanista Peruano.
 2007-2010: Santos Valentín Querevalú Periche, Movimiento de Desarrollo Local.
 2003-2006 / 1994-1998: Justo Eche Morales, Movimiento Independiente Sechura Rumbo al Progreso.
 1999-2002: Porfirio Idelfonso Ayala Morán, Movimiento Independiente Unidos por el Cambio

See also 
 Administrative divisions of Peru

External links 
 INEI Peru

Districts of the Sechura Province